Slate Range may refer to:

 Slate Range (Alberta)
 Slate Range (California)